Douglas R. Hoffer Jr. (born September 3, 1951) is an American policy analyst from Burlington, Vermont, who is currently serving as the Vermont State Auditor. He took office on January 10, 2013.

Personal life
Hoffer was born in New Rochelle, New York, and raised in Norwalk, Connecticut.  He is in a long-term relationship, and has no children.

Hoffer pitched a no-hitter for the VFW Little League team of Norwalk in 1964.  He won the men’s club championship at the Williston Golf Club in 2006.

Education
Hoffer left high school in his junior year, and earned his high school equivalency two years later. He entered Williams College in 1981 at age 30, graduated with a B.A. in political science, and went on to receive a J.D. from the University at Buffalo Law School (magna cum laude).

Career
After leaving high school, Hoffer worked and traveled for over a decade. While living in the Berkshires in western Massachusetts, Doug worked as the Mâitre D’ at Alice's (Restaurant) at Avaloch in Lenox. Upon graduation from law school in 1988, he accepted a position with the City of Burlington in the Community and Economic Development Office (CEDO) having learned of the city's innovative approach to community development under then-mayor Bernie Sanders and CEDO Director Peter Clavelle.

Hoffer left City Hall in 1993 and worked as a self-employed policy analyst for 19 years until winning election as state auditor in 2012. Some of his clients included the Vermont State Auditor, Peace & Justice Center (for whom he wrote all ten phases of The Job Gap Study), Vermont Sustainable Jobs Fund, Vermont State Treasurer, Vermont Employees Association, Yellow Wood Associates, City of Burlington, Burlington Electric Department, and the Public Assets Institute.

Hoffer was appointed to the Burlington Electric Commission by the mayor and city council in 1994. The commission oversees the municipal electric department and Hoffer served as chair of the commission for five of his six years, from 1995 to 2000.

Elected office 
Hoffer first ran for state auditor in 2010 as the Democratic candidate, with an endorsement from the Vermont Progressive Party, and lost to Republican incumbent Tom Salmon.

In 2012, running as the nominee of the Democrats and Progressives, he defeated Republican State Senator Vincent Illuzzi and Liberty Union Party nominee Jerry Levy (Salmon did not run for re-election).

Hoffer ran unopposed in 2014.

In 2016, Hoffer defeated Republican Dan Feliciano and Liberty Union Party candidate Marina Brown.   As in prior campaigns, Hoffer was endorsed by Senator Bernie Sanders.

In 2018, Hoffer defeated Republican Richard Kenyon and Liberty Union Party candidate Marina Brown.

In 2020, Hoffer defeated Progressive Party candidate Cris Ericson.

In 2022, Hoffer defeated  Republican Richard Morton.

Electoral history 

*Hoffer was cross-endorsed by the Vermont Progressive Party.

*Hoffer was cross-endorsed by the Vermont Progressive Party.

*Hoffer was cross-endorsed by the Vermont Progressive Party.

*Hoffer was cross-endorsed by the Vermont Progressive Party.

*Hoffer was cross-endorsed by the Vermont Progressive Party.

References

External links

Government website
Campaign website

1951 births
21st-century American politicians
Living people
Politicians from New Rochelle, New York
Politicians from Burlington, Vermont
Politicians from Norwalk, Connecticut
State Auditors of Vermont
Williams College alumni
University at Buffalo Law School alumni
Vermont Democrats
Vermont Progressive Party politicians